The Wilson Power and Light Company Ice Plant, later known as Delta Ice, is a historic industrial facility at 120 East Broadway in West Memphis, Arkansas.  Built in 1930, it is a regionally distinctive brick structure, used for the manufacture and distribution of ice, a critical product that facilitated the shipment of perishable goods prior to the advent of refrigerated trucks.  Its front facade is dominated by a loading dock, sheltered by a corrugated metal awning.  The main decorative feature of the building is its parapet, formed of brick and cast stone.  The interior retains original features, such as large 40-gallon vats which were used to produce 300-pound blocks of ice.

The building was listed on the National Register of Historic Places in 2010, at which time it was still in use as an icemaking facility.

See also
National Register of Historic Places listings in Crittenden County, Arkansas

References

Industrial buildings and structures on the National Register of Historic Places in Arkansas
Buildings and structures completed in 1930
Buildings and structures in West Memphis, Arkansas
National Register of Historic Places in Crittenden County, Arkansas